Angmering is a railway station on the West Coastway Line, on the border of Angmering and East Preston in the district of Arun. It was opened in 1846. Buses depart for Angmering village hourly (Monday to Saturday off-peak), or walking to the village takes about 20 minutes. The station is located near the local secondary school The Angmering School, some of the students of which use the station daily to travel to and from school. Angmering station is also designed to be used by the residents of the nearby villages of Rustington and East Preston, with some of the station's signage actually reading 'Angmering for Rustington and East Preston'.

History
Opened by the London, Brighton & South Coast Railway, it became part of the Southern Railway during the Grouping of 1923. The line then passed on to the  Southern Region of British Railways on nationalisation in 1948.

When Sectorisation was introduced, the station was served by Network SouthEast until the privatisation of British Rail.

Film of the station in 1937 is held by the Cinema Museum in London on spool HM 00072.

Services
Off-peak, all services at Angmering are operated by Southern using  EMUs.

The typical off-peak service in trains per hour is:

 2 tph to  via 
 2 tph to 
 2 tph to 
 1 tph to 
 1 tph to 

During the peak hours, the station is served by a small number of direct trains between Brighton and Littlehampton.

Former services
Until December 2007 South West Trains also used the station, running four trains per day to Brighton. Until May 2022, one Great Western Railway service from Portsmouth Harbour to Brighton called at Angmering.

Facilities
There is a ticket office, a waiting room, toilets, buffet, car park, taxi rank and cycle storage.

Deaths
A local woman, Maureen Weselby, committed suicide by jumping in front of a Brighton-bound express, operated by South West Trains, in May 2006.

A local teenager, Adam Blackwood, was killed here when a Littlehampton-bound Southern Class 377 train approaching the station knocked him down at a nearby pedestrian level crossing in early 2007.

Another local, 16-year-old Megan Moore of Angmering, was killed after being dragged under the 22:17 London Victoria to Bognor Regis train just before midnight on 21 November 2009. Tributes have been paid on her personal Facebook profile and her "RIP Megan" group, which has nearly 9,000 members. Flowers and messages from friends and family were left outside the station.

Gallery

References

 
 
 Station on navigable O.S. map

External links

Arun District
Former London, Brighton and South Coast Railway stations
DfT Category E stations
Railway stations in West Sussex
Railway stations in Great Britain opened in 1846
Railway stations served by Govia Thameslink Railway
1846 establishments in England